George Tomline is the name of

George Pretyman Tomline (1750–1827), Bishop of Lincoln and Winchester, Dean of St Paul's and confidant of Pitt the Younger
George Tomline (politician) (1813–1889), Member of Parliament for various constituencies